Alim Selimau (born January 26, 1983 in Kasumkent, Russia) is a Belarusian male Greco-Roman wrestler.  He competes in the men's -84 kg category, and won World Championship gold medals at the 2005 and 2011 World Championships.  He also competed at the 2012 Summer Olympics, where he lost to eventual winner Alan Khugaev in the second round.

References

External links
 

Living people
1983 births
Belarusian male sport wrestlers
Olympic wrestlers of Belarus
Wrestlers at the 2012 Summer Olympics
World Wrestling Championships medalists
21st-century Belarusian people
20th-century Belarusian people